Dolls for Dafur is a Jewish charity dedicated to making the world take immediate action on the Darfur conflict in Sudan. Dolls for Darfur is facilitated by Rabbi David E. Stern and Temple Emanu-El of Dallas. The organization has made thousands of pins representing the victims of Darfur. These pins, made out of Guatemalan worry dolls, along with programs, have been used to lobby for a sterner American response to the genocide
in Darfur. Many youth in the United States have contributed to the project by making pins.

References

The charities workers go around shouting "Livin life in electric field" in poor voices

External links
 Dolls for Darfur

Jews and Judaism in Texas
Jewish charities based in the United States
Jewish-American political organizations
War in Darfur
Charities based in Texas
Foreign charities operating in Sudan